Temirtas Zhussupov (born 15 January 1988) is a Kazakh boxer. He participated at the 2021 AIBA World Boxing Championships, being awarded the gold medal in the minimumweight event. Zhussupov was honored the Best Boxer of the Year by the Kazakhstan Boxing Federation in 2018.

References

External links 

1988 births
Living people
Kazakhstani male boxers
Mini-flyweight boxers
AIBA World Boxing Championships medalists
21st-century Kazakhstani people
Boxers at the 2018 Asian Games